Teo A. Babun is a Cuban-American businessman and evangelical philanthropist. He is the founder of BG Consultants and Cuba-Caribbean Development Co. and also the head of Outreach Aid to the Americas (OAA) and AmericasRelief.

Personal life

Early life
Babun's grandparents were born in Bethlehem. His father became a major financial supporter of the Cuban Revolution. Though born in Cuba, Babun has spent most of his childhood and life as a Cuban exile in the United States. Babun's father was tried in a 1960 Communist show trial, intended to confiscate all of his property and belongings. Before the verdict was read in his trial, he escaped to Miami with his wife. Cuban government later expelled the rest of the family to the United States when Babun was 11 years old. They were deported on June 1, 1960 via the Ignacio Agramonte International Airport. Their family home became a residence for Raul Castro, future president of Cuba after the retirement of Fidel Castro. The Cuban Government confiscated the Babun family holdings and properties consisting of a cement plant, farms, maritime, lumber/timber, minerals and other interests after their escape.

Education
Babun lived in Florida until he attended university at Michigan Technological University (MTU), graduating in 1972 with bachelor's degrees in electrical engineering and business engineering administration. In 2002 he received an Honorary Doctorate in Letters from Miami International Seminary (MTU). He also later received a PhD from non-accredited Vision International University. In 2007 was inducted into the Electrical Engineering and Computer Engineering Academy at MTU.

2000 return visit to Cuba
Babun returned to Cuba in  October 2000, as an "official observant" to open-air Evangelical Celebrations instituted after the visit of Pope John Paul II in 1999. Following this visit Babun was asked by government officials not to return to Cuba, due to the reaction of the public to his evangelical work.

Career
Babun began his professional career manufacturing electrical components in Wisconsin and Connecticut. He founded General Electro-Components in 1980 to manufacture electrical relays and solenoids under the brand "Line Electric", serving as president and CEO. In 1981 he developed the TO-5, then known as "The World's Smallest Solenoid." In 1987 he moved back to South Florida in order to work for his father's company, Bahamas Line shipping company. In 1990 Babun founded the Cuba Investment Fund, in order to accumulate investment funds and strategies for when the United States lifts the economic embargo they have levied on the island.

Babun is the founder and head of BG Consultants, located in Miami. He is also the founder and managing partner of the Miami consulting firm Cuba-Caribbean Development Co, a division of his Babun Group Consulting that advises companies on the potential of a future free market in Cuba. In his role with the for-profit company he has advocated for a change in Cuban-US economic relations. Babun's clients have included Baskin Robbins and Royal Caribbean Cruises.	

In 1992 he founded the Babun Shipping Corporation in Miami under his holding company T. Babun Co. He was also the founder of Cuba Claims Registry Assistance LLP, a property registry for Cuban exiles to establish claims upon land and other property that was confiscated.

Ministry, Activism, and Controversies

In 1994 Babun decided to dedicate the rest of his life to humanitarian ministry in support of vulnerable persons in the region and the emerging church in Cuba.  He founded Outreach Aid to the Americas, Inc.  (OAA).  The organization responds to the needs of the vulnerable people in the Americas Region through relief and development programs.  OAA thru its faith-based initiative “EchoCuba” uses methodologies, tools, and training modules to help advance entrepreneurship, organizational skills, education, religious freedoms, and social services in Cuba.

In 2016 OAA expanded services to Central America, the Caribbean Islands, including Puerto Rico and Southern Mexico to send aid from the US to faith-based organizations and provide business development products to encourage small business creation. As the spokesperson for the organization, he has advocated for religious freedoms, small business ownership as one of the keys to creating the conditions necessary for reducing poverty  in Central America, and for more effective disaster resiliency programs  to save lives in countries affected by hurricanes.

On February 12, 2019 he was accused of being a “public enemy and a mercenary” of Cuba by Granma, Cuba's official publication of the Central Committee of the Communist Party. He was charged with trying to create discord among Evangelical Church Leaders in Cuba by “providing them with misleading information and enticing them to commit acts of disobedience with promises of humanitarian aid.”  In interviews with Radio & Television Marti, Babun defended his efforts to unify the Evangelical Church Leaders around a shared advocacy campaign to obtain greater Freedom of Religion and Belief language in a new constitution scheduled for a referendum on February 24, 2019.

In 2021 OAA expanded its international advocacy work on Freedom of Religion & Belief to include Nicaragua. It also built its local capacity of faith-based partners in the Central American Northern Triangle Countries of Honduras, El Salvador, and Guatemala to participate in The United States Agency for International Development’s (USAID) efforts to help address the drivers of irregular migration to the United States.

In 2022 he advocated for religion freedom and belief for Nicaragua and Cuba at the Oslo Freedom Forum in Geneva where he lead a panel discussion titled “America’s Wars: How to Defend Human Rights and Religion in Cuba, Nicaragua, and Venezuela”, and at the Summit of the Americas in Los Angeles, where he also spoke at side events against the authoritarian governments of Cuba, Venezuela, and Nicaragua. On October 1 of the same year, Babun received the Outstanding Community Service Award from The Florida Faith-Based and Community-Based Advisory Council, in an event that brought together Miami-Dade County elected officials and faith community leaders to better engage, communicate, and collaborate to help build Miami and its communities.

Publishing
Babun is the author of The Business Guide to Cuba,. The Sun-Sentinel stated that for "foreign companies - and to U.S. entrepreneurs who want the lay of the land ahead of normalized relations - Babun's book provides precious detail for strategic planning".

He also co-authored the book The Cuban Revolution: The Years of Promise with Victor Andres Triay in 2005,  using photographs of the Cuban Revolution owned by Babun's father used as the primary focus of the book. José Manuel García reviewed the book in the Arizona Journal of Hispanic Cultural Studies, calling the book "an exceptionally significant contribution to Cuban history through the power of photography". Babun has also self-published the book Dealing with Your Personal Crisis, which presents Christian coping methods for  personal traumas. His recent prayer and reflection books also include Practicing His Presence: 8 Minutes of Daily Intimacy with God and Buenos Dias Abba: Sabiduria y Reflexion Para Todos Los Dias.

Babun has been a contributor to newspapers including the Chicago Tribune, the Washington Post, the Miami Herald, El Nuevo Herald, The Washington Examiner, and The Sun Sentinel.

References

External links
 DrTeo.us
 BG Consultants, Inc.
 Outreach Aid to the Americas
 ECHOCuba
 Community & Port Resiliency Program

Cuban male writers
Exiles of the Cuban Revolution in the United States
Evangelists
Businesspeople from Florida
American people of Cuban descent
American non-fiction writers
American military historians
American male non-fiction writers
Michigan Technological University alumni
Living people
1948 births